Anandeswaram Sree Mahadeva Kshethram (Malayalam: ആനന്ദേശ്വര൦ ശ്രീമഹാദേവ ക്ഷേത്ര൦) is one of the oldest temple in the Pandanad village. It is located at Pandanad in Chengannur taluk of Alappuzha district in the south Indian state of Kerala.

Anandeswaram Sree Mahadeva Kshethram is a Hindu temple, dedicated to Shiva. The temple was earlier on the bank of the river Pampa. It was destroyed by the changed direction of the flow of the river.  
The deity was replaced to a nearby place where it is known as Anandeswaram Mahadeva Kshethram by Vanjipuzha Madom who was the former owner of the temple.

Important days
Maha Shivarathri (മഹാ ശിവരാത്രി): The major festival is Maha Shivarathri which takes place during the month of Kumbham (കു൦ഭ൦).

Sapthaha Yajnam (സപ്താഹ യജ്ഞം): Each year Sapthaham celebrates for 7 days with worships and food for devotees.

Navaha Yajnam (നവാഹ യജ്ഞം): Each year 'Navaha Yajnam' celebrates for 9 days with worships and food for devotees.

Parayeduppu (പറയെടുപ്പ്): The Parayeduppu is happening in the festival season, before to the Maha Shivarathri. Mahadeva is visiting to the homes of the people in Pandanad area.

Sub-deities

Like other Hindu temples, Anandeshwaram Mahadeva also has shrines of other deities. These deities include shrines of Maha Vishnu (മഹാവിഷ്ണു), Parvati (പാർവ്വതി) as Bhuvaneshwary (ഭുവനേശ്വരി), Ganapathy(ഗണപതി), Sasthavu (ശാസ്താവ്), Yakshiamma (യക്ഷിയമ്മ), Nagarajav (നാഗരാജാവ്), Nagayakshi (നാഗയക്ഷി), Brahmarakshas (ബ്രഹ്മരക്ഷസ്).

See also

 Maha Shivaratri
 Pandanad
 Temples of Kerala
 Temple festivals of Kerala

References

Hindu temples in Alappuzha district
Shiva temples in Kerala